Rouses Point Seaplane Base  is a public use seaplane base located on the Richelieu River in Rouses Point, a village in Clinton County, New York, United States.

Facilities and aircraft 
Rouses Point Seaplane Base resides at elevation of 95 feet (29 m) above mean sea level. It has one seaplane landing area designated ALL/WAY with a water surface measuring 7,900 by 500 feet (2,408 x 152 m). For the 12-month period ending May 20, 2010, the airport had 46 general aviation aircraft operations.

References

External links 
 Gaines Marina
 Aerial image as of May 1994 from USGS The National Map
 

Airports in New York (state)
Seaplane bases in the United States
Transportation buildings and structures in Clinton County, New York
Binational airports